William Henry Murray (June 3, 1876 – October 12, 1923) was an American private serving in the United States Marine Corps during the Boxer Rebellion who received the Medal of Honor for bravery.

Biography
Murray was born June 3, 1876, in Brooklyn, New York and enlisted into the Marine Corps from Brooklyn on April 8, 1898, under the name Henry W. Davis. After entering the Marine Corps he was sent to fight in the Chinese Boxer Rebellion. He received the Medal for his actions in Peking, China from July 21 – August 17, 1900 and it was presented to him July 19, 1901. He died October 12, 1923, and is buried in Oak Grove Cemetery, Medford, Massachusetts. His grave can be found in the Mystic Lawn, O-61.

Medal of Honor citation
Rank and organization: Private, U.S. Marine Corps. Born: 3 June 1876, Brooklyn, N.Y. Accredited to: New York. G.O. No.: 55, 19 July 1901.

Citation:

In the presence of the enemy during the action at Peking, China, 21 July to 17 August 1900. During this period, Murray distinguished himself by meritorious conduct. (Served as Henry W. Davis.)

See also

 List of Medal of Honor recipients
 List of Medal of Honor recipients for the Boxer Rebellion

References

External links
 
 

1876 births
1923 deaths
United States Marine Corps Medal of Honor recipients
United States Marines
American military personnel of the Boxer Rebellion
People from Brooklyn
Boxer Rebellion recipients of the Medal of Honor